Kolionovo is a rural locality (a village) in Yegoryevsky District of Moscow Oblast, Russia. As of the 2010 Census, its population was 9.

Geography

History
The village was first mentioned in 1577 as Kalinovo—a name derived from the personal name Kalina. In the second half of the 18th century, the name distorted into Kalivonovo, then into Kolivonovo, and finally into its present form.

Local money controversy
The village gained notoriety in 2010 when resident Mikhail Shlyapnikov fought local turf fires without government assistance. The village also banned government officials from entering without a note proving their mental health and a recent fluorography lab test to prove that they do not have tuberculosis. In 2014, Shlyapnikov created a local currency, a so-called "kolion", as an alternative to the ruble. Shlyapnikov was later arrested and the kolion was declared illegal tender.

References

Notes

Sources
Е.М. Поспелов (Ye.M. Поспелов). "Географические названия Московской области. Топонимический словарь" (Geographic Names in Moscow Oblast. Topographic Dictionary.). Москва, АСТ.

External links
A farm outside of Moscow gets a new chance at life in the crypto zone - RBTH

Rural localities in Moscow Oblast